The Iceland men's national under-18 basketball team is the national representative for Iceland in men's international under-18 and under-19 basketball tournaments. They are organized and run by the Icelandic Basketball Association. They are coached by Ingi Þór Steinþórsson.

The team competes at the U18 European Championship, mostly in Division B.

U18 European Championship

See also
Iceland men's national basketball team
Iceland men's national under-20 basketball team
Iceland men's national under-16 basketball team

References

External links
Official website 
FIBA profile

 
National sports teams of Iceland
Men's national under-18 basketball teams